This is a list of foreign players in the top flight of Norwegian football, currently known as Eliteserien, which commenced play in 1937. The following players must meet both of the following two criteria:
Have played at least one Eliteserien game. Players who were signed by Eliteserien clubs, but only played in lower league, cup and/or European games, or did not play in any competitive games at all, are not included.
Are considered foreign, determined by the following:
A player is considered foreign if he is not eligible to play for Norway national football team, more specifically:
If a player has been capped on international level, the national team is used; if he has been capped by more than one country, the highest level (or the most recent) team is used.
If a player has not been capped on international level, his country of birth is used, except those who were born abroad from Norwegian parents or moved to Norway at a young age, and those who clearly indicated to have switched his nationality to another nation.

Clubs listed are those for which the player has played at least one Eliteserien game — and seasons are those in which the player has played at least one Eliteserien game.

In bold: players who have played at least one Eliteserien game in the current season (2022), and are still at a club for which they have played. This does not include current players of an Eliteserien club who have not played an Eliteserien game in the current season.

Details correct as of 28 November 2021

Albania
Jahmir Hyka – Rosenborg – 2006
Agon Mehmeti – Stabæk – 2016–17
Migen Memelli – Brann – 2006
Sebino Plaku – HamKam – 2008

Algeria
Habib Bellaïd – Sarpsborg 08 – 2015
Redouane Drici – Brann – 1984, 1987–91

Andorra
Marc Vales – Sandefjord – 2018, 2020-21

Argentina
Matías Almeyda – Lyn – 2007
José Oscar Flores – Lyn – 2007
Pablo Fontanello – Stabæk – 2014
Renzo Giampaoli – Rosenborg – 2022–
Enrique Ortiz – Lyn – 2005–07
Lucas Pratto – Lyn – 2008–09
Diego de la Vega – Bryne – 2002

Armenia
Levon Pachajyan – Fredrikstad – 2009

Australia
Ahmad Elrich – Lyn – 2006
Alex Gersbach – Rosenborg – 2016–19
Chad Gibson – Bodø/Glimt – 2001
Ante Jurić – Molde – 1999
Stephen Laybutt – Lyn – 2001
Dylan Macallister – Brann, Lyn – 2004–06
Anthony Magnacca – Brann – 2001
Jade North – Tromsø – 2010
Michael Petkovic – Lillestrøm – 2001
Saša Radulović – Lillestrøm – 2005
Shane Stefanutto – Lillestrøm, Lyn – 2004–09
Gianni Stensness – Viking  – 2021–
Michael Thwaite – Brann – 2008
Kasey Wehrman – Moss, Lillestrøm, Fredrikstad, Lyn  – 2001–02, 2003–09
Clayton Zane – Molde, Lillestrøm – 2000–02

Austria
Markus Berger – Start – 2014
Roman Kienast – Ham-Kam – 2006, 2008
Markus Kiesenebner – Lillestrøm – 2007
Martin Kreuzriegler – Sandefjord – 2020–21
Michael Langer – Vålerenga – 2014–15
Mario Pavelić – Sarpsborg 08 – 2019
Thomas Piermayr – Lillestrøm – 2013
Martin Pušić – Vålerenga, Fredrikstad, Brann – 2012–14
Samuel Şahin-Radlinger – Brann – 2018
Paul Scharner – Brann – 2004–06
Benjamin Sulimani – Viking – 2013
Dominique Taboga – Tromsø – 2009–10

Belgium
David Brocken – Vålerenga – 2004–05
Steve Cooreman – Ham-Kam – 2006, 2008
Álex Craninx – Molde, Lillestrøm – 2019–, 2021
Jimmy De Wulf – Tromsø – 2001
Yassine El Ghanassy – Stabæk – 2015
Tortol Lumanza – Stabæk – 2017–18, 2019–21
Akwasi Oduro – Bodø/Glimt – 2009
Marvin Ogunjimi – Strømsgodset – 2014–16
Koen Schockaert – Tromsø – 2001
Axel Smeets – Ham-Kam – 2004–06
Karel Snoeckx – Vålerenga – 2003

Benin
Jordan Adéoti – Sarpsborg 08 – 2020
Sidoine Oussou – Vålerenga – 2011

Bosnia and Herzegovina
Adnan Čaušević – Tromsø – 2013–14
Eldar Hadžimehmedović – Lyn, Strømsgodset – 2001–04
Haris Hajradinović – Haugesund – 2016–17
Omar Marković – Start – 2013
Adnan Mravac – Lillestrøm – 2001
Darko Nestorović – Ham-Kam – 1995
Amer Ordagić – Brann, Sandefjord – 2018–20, 2021–
Amer Osmanagić – Haugesund – 2012
Sead Ramović – Tromsø, Lillestrøm, Strømsgodset – 2006–10, 2012, 2014
Admir Raščić – Sandefjord – 2009–10
Fenan Salčinović – Sandefjord – 2009
Samir Šarić – Sandefjord – 2009–10
Besim Šerbečić – Rosenborg, Aalesund – 2018, 2021, 2022–
Haris Skenderović – Stabæk – 2011

Brazil
Adriano – Sandefjord, Tromsø – 2006–09
Agnaldo – Molde – 2013–16
Alanzinho – Stabæk – 2006–08, 2016–17
Dedé Anderson – Aalesund – 2006–09
Daniel Bamberg – Haugesund – 2011, 2013–15
Samuel Camazzola – Sandefjord – 2008–10
Leonardo Ferreira da Silva – Ham-Kam – 2008
Vini Dantas – Molde – 2011–12 
Diego – Brann – 2010
Diogo – Stabæk – 2010
Edmílson – Lyn – 2004
Éverton – Fredrikstad – 2008–09
Gilmak – Fredrikstad – 2010
Juninho – Brann – 2010–11 
Kayke – Tromsø – 2010
Leonardo – Ham-Kam – 2008
Marcelo – Odd Grenland – 2009
Marciano – Sandefjord – 2009–10
Marlinho – Aalesund – 2015–17
Thiago Martins – Bodø/Glimt – 2007–10
Wélton Araújo Melo – Fredrikstad – 2003
José Mota – Molde – 2008, 2008–11
Neydson – Molde – 2015 
Bechara Oliveira – Aalesund – 2005
Pernambuco – Bodø/Glimt – 2021
 – Start – 2007
Ricardo Friedrich – Bodø/Glimt – 2018–19
Ricardo Santos – Sogndal – 2012
Diego Silva – Aalesund – 2007–10
Bruno Gabriel Soares – Haugesund – 2017
Tigrão – Odd Grenland – 2006
Tomaz Júnior – Molde – 2008–09
Fernando Wallace – Fredrikstad – 2008–09
Ygor – Start – 2007
Zé Eduardo – Sandefjord – 2020–21

Bulgaria
Ivaylo Kirov – Lillestrøm – 1990

Burkina Faso
Yssouf Koné – Rosenborg, Vålerenga – 2006–08, 2011
Bakary Saré – Rosenborg – 2010
Abdou Razack Traoré – Rosenborg – 2007–10

Burundi
Parfait Bizoza – Aalesund – 2020
Janvier Ndikumana – Sandnes Ulf – 2011
Selemani Ndikumana – Molde – 2008

Cameroon
Thomas Amang – Molde, Kristiansund – 2016–19
Gustave Bahoken – Aalesund – 2005–08
Faris Pemi Moumbagna – Kristiansund – 2020–
Arnaud Monkam – Brann– 2006
Alain Junior Ollé Ollé – Stabæk – 2011–12
Patrick Suffo – Odd Grenland – 2005
Duplexe Tchamba – Strømsgodset – 2019–21
Somen Tchoyi – Odd Grenland, Stabæk – 2005–08
Guy Toindouba – Lillestrøm – 2012

Canada

Sam Adekugbe – Vålerenga – 2018–21
Stephen Ademolu – Tromsø – 2005–07
Clément Bayiha – Ham-Kam – 2022–
Patrice Bernier – Tromsø – 2004–07
Julian Dunn – Ham-Kam – 2022–
Rob Friend – Molde – 2004–06
Ali Gerba – Odd Grenland – 2006
Sandro Grande – Viking, Molde – 2005, 2006–07
Kevin Harmse – Tromsø – 2003
Lars Hirschfeld – Tromsø, Rosenborg, Vålerenga – 2005–07, 2010–11
Zakaria Messoudi – Odd – 2016–18
Tam Nsaliwa – Lillestrøm – 2010
Olivier Occéan – Odd Grenland, Lillestrøm, Mjøndalen – 2004–06, 2006–10, 2015–18, 2019
Chris Pozniak – Haugesund – 2010–12
Marco Reda – Sogndal – 2002–04
Tosaint Ricketts – Vålerenga, Sandnes Ulf – 2012–13
Kevin De Serpa – Haugesund – 2005
Kenny Stamatopoulos – Tromsø, Lyn, Fredrikstad – 2006–09
Simon Thomas – Bodø/Glimt, Sarpsborg 08, Tromsø – 2016, 2020, 2022–

Cape Verde
Willis Furtado – Jerv – 2022–
Bruno Leite – Haugesund – 2017–21
Erikson Spinola Lima – Sarpsborg 08, Aalesund – 2017, 2020, 2022–
Paulo Dos Santos – Aalesund – 2003, 2005

Chile
Niklas Castro – Vålerenga, Aalesund – 2016, 2020
Diego Rubio – Sandnes Ulf – 2014

Comoros
Ali Ahamada – Brann – 2020

Costa Rica

Bismar Acosta – Start, Brann – 2013–14, 2016–20
Wílmer Azofeifa – Sarpsborg 08 – 2019
Michael Barrantes – Aalesund – 2010–15
Christian Bolaños – Start – 2009–10
Celso Borges – Fredrikstad – 2009–11
Diego Calvo – Vålerenga – 2013
Jorge Castro – Start, Sarpsborg 08 – 2013–15
Pablo Herrera – Aalesund – 2009–11
Randall Brenes – Bodø/Glimt, Sandnes Ulf – 2005, 2008, 2014
Mynor Escoe – Stabæk – 2016–17
Cristian Gamboa – Fredrikstad, Rosenborg – 2011, 2012–14
Mayron George – Vålerenga – 2019
Giancarlo González – Vålerenga – 2012–13
Juan Diego Madrigal – Fredrikstad – 2013
Yherland McDonald – Fredrikstad – 2004–06
Roy Miller – Bodø/Glimt, Rosenborg – 2005, 2008–09
Carlos Castro Mora – Haugesund – 2007
Heiner Mora – Hønefoss – 2012–13
David Myrie – Fredrikstad – 2011
Fernando Paniagua – Start – 2014–15
Rodolfo Rodríguez – Haugesund – 2007–08
Douglas Sequeira – Tromsø – 2007–09
Alonso Solís – Brann – 2002
Daniel Torres – Tromsø, Bryne – 2005, 2008
Deyver Vega – Brann, Vålerenga, Sandefjord – 2016–18, 2019-20, 2020, 2021–

Croatia
Dario Čanađija – Sarpsborg 08, Aalesund – 2021, 2022–
Marko Ćosić – Haugesund – 2017–18
Šime Gregov – Viking – 2017–18
Ante Knezovic – Kristiansund BK – 2017–18
Mirko Kramarić – Haugesund – 2014–15
Filip Lončarić – Tromsø – 2016–18
Mate Maleš – Sarpsborg 08 – 2019–20
Marin Oršulić – Tromsø – 2015
Nikola Tkalčić – Sarpsborg 08 – 2018–19
Ante Vitaić – Ham-Kam – 2008
Dario Zahora – Rosenborg – 2009

Czech Republic

Bořek Dočkal – Rosenborg – 2011–13
Martin Fillo – Viking – 2008–10
Josef Kaufman – Viking – 2008
Jan Lecjaks – Vålerenga – 2013
Zdeněk Ondrášek – Tromsø – 2012, 2012–15, 2021
Zbyněk Pospěch – Odd Grenland – 2007
Zdeněk Šenkeřík – Stabæk – 2009
Michal Škoda – Lillestrøm – 2017

Denmark

Mikkel Agger – Sarpsborg 08 – 2018–19
Andreas Albech – Sarpsborg 08 – 2017–18
Alexander Ammitzbøll – Haugesund, Aalesund – 2020, 2022– 
Malte Amundsen – Rosenborg – 2018–19
Bo Andersen – Viking, Tromsø, Sandnes Ulf – 2000–02, 2005, 2012
Erik Bo Andersen – Odd Grenland – 2000–01
Peter Ankersen – Rosenborg – 2012
Daniel Arrocha – Jerv – 2022–
Ulrik Balling – Tromsø – 1997
Nicklas Bendtner – Rosenborg – 2017–19
Søren Berg – Viking – 2006–07
Morten Bertolt – Ham-Kam, Sandnes Ulf – 2006, 2012
Allan Borgvardt – Viking – 2005
Martin Borre – Start – 2007
Tonny Brochmann – Sogndal, Stabæk, Mjøndalen – 2011–14, 2017–18, 2019–21 
Jakob Busk – Sandefjord – 2015
Anders Bærtelsen – Haugesund – 2021–
Martin Christensen – Haugesund – 2010
Søren Christensen – Haugesund – 2015
Denni Conteh – Molde – 2006
Rasmus Daugaard – Lyn – 2006–07
Mikkel Desler – Haugesund – 2019–21
Steffen Ernemann – Sarpsborg 08, Viking – 2013–16, 2017
Oliver Feldballe – Sarpsborg 08 – 2014–15
Christian Flindt-Bjerg – Viking, Odd Grenland – 1997–2005
Allan Gaarde – Viking – 2005–08
Pascal Gregor – Haugesund – 2019
Christian Gytkjær – Sandnes Ulf, Haugesund, Rosenborg – 2012, 2013–15, 2016–17
Frederik Gytkjær – Haugesund – 2017–18
Mathias Haarup – Jerv – 2022–
Benjamin Hansen – Haugesund, Molde – 2019–21, 2022–
Martin Hansen – Strømsgodset – 2019
Rune Hansen – Sandefjord – 2009–10
Jakob Haugaard – Tromsø – 2022–
Carlo Holse – Rosenborg – 2020–
Frederik Holst – Lillestrøm – 2022–
Mads Dittmer Hvilsom – Brann – 2016
Alexander Jakobsen – Bodø/Glimt – 2016
Michael Jakobsen – Lillestrøm – 2016
Martin Jensen – Sandefjord – 2007, 2009–10
Mike Jensen – Rosenborg – 2013–19
Søren Jensen – Odd Grenland – 2009
Victor Jensen – Rosenborg – 2022–
Allan Jepsen – Vålerenga – 2006–09
Dan Anton Johansen – Lillestrøm – 2007
Timmi Johansen – Stabæk – 2014–15
Henrik Jørgensen – Fyllingen – 1991
Kasper Jørgensen – Aalesunds – 2020
Mads Jørgensen – Stabæk – 2004
Marco Priis Jørgensen – Mjøndalen – 2015
Kasper Junker – Stabæk, Bodø/Glimt – 2019, 2020
Pierre Kanstrup – Vålerenga – 2019
Sanel Kapidžić – Mjøndalen – 2015
Christian Keller – Stabæk – 2006–09
Henrik Kildentoft – Haugesund – 2013–14
Mikkel Kirkeskov – Aalesund – 2016–17
Claes Kronberg – Sarpsborg 08, Viking – 2011, 2013–17
Jim Larsen – Rosenborg – 2011
Morten Larsen – Start – 2002
Lasse Heinze – Sarpsborg 08 – 2015
Anders Lindegaard – Aalesund – 2009–10
Kasper Lunding – Odd – 2020
Steven Lustü – Lyn – 2002–06
Mikkel Maigaard – Strømsgodset, Sarpsborg 08 – 2019–21, 2021–
Jan Michaelsen – Ham-Kam – 2004–06, 2008
Tobias Mikkelsen – Rosenborg – 2013–15
Patrick Mortensen – Sarpsborg 08 – 2015–18
Agon Muçolli – Kristiansund – 2021–
David Nielsen – Start, Strømsgodset, Brann – 2006–07, 2008, 2009–10, 2011
Marcus Mølvadgaard – Strømsgodset – 2020
Emil Nielsen – Rosenborg – 2015–16
Nicki Bille Nielsen – Rosenborg – 2013
Matti Lund Nielsen – Sarpsborg 08 – 2016–19
Allan Olesen – Haugesund – 2010
Patrick Olsen – Strømsgodset, Haugesund – 2014, 2015
Daniel A. Pedersen – Lillestrøm, Brann – 2018-2019, 2020–21
Kasper Pedersen – Stabæk – 2021
Mads Pedersen – Sandefjord – 2014–15
Magnus Pedersen – Sogndal – 2016–17
Patrick Pedersen – Viking – 2016–17
Nicolai Poulsen – Sarpsborg 08 – 2017
Brian Priske – Start – 2011
Jacob Rasmussen – Rosenborg – 2017–18
Christoffer Remmer – Molde – 2016–19
Søren Reese – Haugesund – 2022–
Joachim Rothmann – Tromsø IL – 2021
Tobias Salquist – Lillestrøm – 2019
Peter Sand – Stabæk – 2002–04
Ronnie Schwartz – Sarpsborg 08 – 2018
Japhet Sery Larsen – Brann, Bodø/Glimt – 2021, 2022–
Aral Şimşir – Jerv – 2022–
Anton Skipper – Sarpsborg 08 – 2022–
Peter Skov-Jensen – Sandefjord – 2007
Sammy Skytte – Stabæk, Bodø/Glimt – 2019, 2020, 2020–21
Oskar Snorre – Haugesund – 2019
Jacob Sørensen – Odd Grenland, Haugesund – 2006–07, 2010–11
Oliver Sørensen – Ham-Kam – 2022–
Peter Sørensen – Ham-Kam – 2004–05
Martin Spelmann – Strømsgodset – 2019
Kris Stadsgaard – Rosenborg – 2008–10
Nicolai Stokholm – Viking – 2006–08
Peter Therkildsen – Haugesund – 2020–
Nicolaj Thomsen – Vålerenga – 2021
Dan Thomassen – Vålerenga – 2007–08
Jess Thorup – Ham-Kam – 2005
Mads Timm – Viking, Lyn – 2004–05
Ole Tobiasen – Sandefjord – 2006
Youssef Toutouh – Stabæk – 2019
Christian Traoré – Hønefoss – 2010
Michael Tørnes – Sandefjord – 2015
Mikkel Vendelbo – Hønefoss – 2012–13
Niklas Vesterlund – Tromsø – 2021–
Michael Vesterskov – Fredrikstad – 1981–82
Jens Waltorp – Stabæk – 2006
Daniel Wass – Fredrikstad – 2009
Mathias Wichmann – Jerv – 2022–
Felix Winther – Tromsø – 2021–
Philip Zinckernagel – Bodø/Glimt – 2018–21
Bora Zivkovic – Fredrikstad – 2004–06
Martin Ørnskov – Viking – 2012–13

DR Congo
Richard Ekunde – Viking – 2013

Egypt
Alexander Jakobsen – Sarpsborg 08 – 2020–

El Salvador
Jaime Alas – Rosenborg – 2012–13

England
Ben Amos – Molde – 2010
Aidan Barlow – Tromsø – 2019
Neil Cartwright – Sogndal – 1991
Lee Chapman – Strømsgodset – 1996
Tony Cheek – Djerv 1919 – 1988
Gary Chivers – Lyn – 1993
Martin Chivers – Vard Haugesund – 1981–82
Paul Davis – Stabæk – 1995
Corey Donoghue – Strømsgodset – 2001
Andrew Eleftheriou – Sandefjord – 2018
Gary Ford – Tromsø – 1993
Kenny Gasser – Kongsvinger – 1992
Gary Goodchild – Viking – 1981–85
George Green – Viking – 2017
Bobby Hodge – Fredrikstad – 1982
Ross Jenkins – Viking – 2017
Chris Joyce – Odd Grenland – 2006–08
Elliot Kebbie – Sandefjord – 2017
James Keene – Fredrikstad – 2011
Stephen Kinsey – Molde – 1993
Michael Ledger – Viking – 2017
David Macciochi – Sogndal – 1991
Neil MacLeod – Brann – 1976–1981, 1983
David Mannix – HamKam – 2008
Gary Martin – Lillestrøm – 2016
Paul Miller – Skeid – 1978
Kieffer Moore – Viking – 2015
Trevor Morley – Brann, Sogndal – 1992, 1993, 1995, 1998
Paul Moulden – Molde – 1992
Alex Nimely – Stabæk – 2017
Adrian Pennock – Molde – 1991
Mark Robson – Rosenborg – 1991
Luke Rodgers – Lillestrøm SK – 2012
Dale Rudge – Djerv 1919 – 1988
Pat Schanzenbecker – Brann – 1979
Aaron Wilbraham – Moss – 2000
John Williams – Strømsgodset – 1991
Ben Wright – Viking, Start – 2001–02, 2005

Estonia
Henri Anier – Viking – 2012
Nikita Baranov – Kristiansund – 2017–18
Alo Bärengrub – Bodø/Glimt – 2008–09
Aleksandr Dmitrijev – Hønefoss – 2008, 2008–11
Matvei Igonen – Lillestrøm – 2018–19
Enar Jääger – Aalesund, Vålerenga – 2007–09, 2010–12, 2015–18
Ragnar Klavan – Vålerenga – 2004
Artur Kotenko – Sandnes Ulf, Viking – 2008, 2009–10
Marek Lemsalu – Strømsgodset, Start, Bryne – 1999, 2001, 2002–05
Joel Lindpere – Tromsø – 2007–09
Pavel Londak – Bodø/Glimt, Rosenborg – 2008–15, 2016–17
Karol Mets – Viking – 2015–17
Henrik Ojamaa – Sarpsborg 08 – 2015
Raio Piiroja – Vålerenga, Fredrikstad – 2003, 2004–11
Sander Post – Aalesund – 2011–12
Taijo Teniste – Sogndal, Brann – 2011–14, 2016–
Sergei Terehhov – Brann – 2000–02
Kristen Viikmäe – Vålerenga, Fredrikstad – 2000, 2002–03, 2005

Faroe Islands
Atli Danielsen – Sogndal – 2004–05
Jóan Símun Edmundsson – Viking – 2012, 2013
Hans Fróði Hansen – Sogndal – 2000–01
Julian Johnsson – Kongsvinger, Sogndal – 1998–99, 2001
Todi Jónsson – Start – 2005–06
Jákup Mikkelsen – Molde – 2001–03
Kurt Mørkøre – Sogndal – 1999–2001
Meinhard Olsen – Kristiansund – 2019
Gilli Rólantsson – Brann, Odd – 2016–20, 2021–

Finland
Kari Arkivuo – Sandefjord – 2006–07
Lauri Dalla Valle – Molde – 2013
Otto Fredrikson – Lillestrøm, Vålerenga, Tromsø – 2006–09, 2015, 2017–19
Tuomas Haapala – Sandefjord – 2006–07
Jukka Hakala – Start, Sogndal – 2002, 2004
Dani Hatakka – Brann – 2016–18
Tapio Heikkilä – Start – 2016
Markus Heikkinen – Start – 2013
Janne Hietanen – Tromsø – 2005
Jarkko Hurme – Odd – 2014–15
Keijo Huusko – Lyn, Strømsgodset, Tromsø – 2005, 2007–09
Ville Jalasto – Aalesund, Stabæk  – 2009–12, 2014–15
Toni Kallio – Molde Viking – 2004–06, 2010
Kaan Kairinen – Lillestrøm – 2021–
Benjamin Källman – Viking, Haugesund – 2019, 2020
Mikko Kavén – Vålerenga – 1999–2000
Toni Kolehmainen – Hønefoss – 2012–13
Tuomo Könönen – Odd – 2006–07
Miika Koppinen – Tromsø, Rosenborg, Tromsø – 2000–14
Peter Kopteff – Viking, Aalesund – 2002–05, 2008–09
Tero Koskela – Fredrikstad – 2004–05
Toni Koskela – Molde – 2008
Sampo Koskinen – Sandefjord – 2007
Mika Kottila – Brann – 1999
Toni Kuivasto – Viking – 2001–03
Ville Lehtinen – Bodø/Glimt – 2002–04
Mathias Lindström – Fredrikstad – 2005
Sami Mahlio – Odd Grenland – 1999–2002
Tero Mäntylä – Aalesund – 2015–17
Jon Masalin – HamKam, Fredrikstad – 2008, 2011–12
Sakari Mattila – Aalesund – 2014–15
Miikka Multaharju – Fredrikstad – 2006–07
Henri Myntti – Tromsø – 2001
Kari Niskala – Brann – 1978
Juha Pasoja – Ham-Kam – 2006, 2008
Hannu Patronen – Sogndal – 2012–17
 – Bodø/Glimt – 2001–03
Juha Pirinen – Tromsø – 2019
Jukka Raitala – Sogndal – 2016–17
Pasi Rasimus – Lillestrøm – 1990
Aki Riihilahti – Vålerenga – 1999–2000
Riku Riski – Hønefoss, Rosenborg, Odd – 2012–17
Roope Riski – Hønefoss, Haugesund – 2012, 2015
Janne Saarinen – Rosenborg – 2001–03
Juska Savolainen – Rosenborg, Haugesund – 2010
Henri Sillanpää – Tromsø – 2012
Christian Sund – Stabæk – 2006
Kimmo Tauriainen – Start – 2002
Robert Taylor – Tromsø, Brann – 2018–19, 2020-21
Hannu Tihinen – Viking – 2000, 2001–02
Joona Toivio – Molde – 2013–17
Henri Toivomäki – Sarpsborg 08 – 2016–18
Jasse Tuominen – Tromsø – 2022–
Marko Tuomela – Tromsø – 1998–99, 2000
Ville Väisänen – Bryne – 2003
Onni Valakari – Tromsø – 2018–19
Hermanni Vuorinen – Fredrikstad – 2006–07
Jarkko Wiss – Lillestrøm, Molde – 1999–2000
Harri Ylönen – Brann – 1999–2001

France
El Hadji Ba – Stabæk – 2017
Hervé Bacqué – Lyn – 1999
Anthony Basso – Viking – 2005–06
Jérémy Berthod – Sarpsborg 08 – 2013–15
Alexy Bosetti – Sarpsborg 08 – 2016
Derek Decamps – Haugesund, Sarpsborg 08, Sandnes Ulf – 2011–12, 2013, 2014
Florent Hanin – Strømsgodset – 2015
Cyril Kali – Lillestrøm – 2007
Amadou Konaté – Bodø/Glimt – 2019–20
Alexandre Letellier – Sarpsborg 08 – 2019
Malaury Martin – Sandnes Ulf, Lillestrøm – 2014, 2015–17
Prosper Mendy – Strømsgodset – 2019–21
Rashad Muhammed – Sarpsborg 08 – 2018, 2021–
Christophe Psyché – Sogndal, Kristiansund, Tromsø – 2014, 2016–17, 2018–21, 2021–

Gabon
Serge-Junior Martinsson Ngouali – Sarpsborg 08 – 2022–
Gilles Mbang Ondo – Stabæk, Sandnes Ulf – 2011–12

Gambia
Jibril Bojang – Start, Mjøndalen – 2016, 2019
Sulayman Bojang – Sarpsborg 08, Haugesund – 2018–20, 2021
Abdou Darboe – Hønefoss – 2010
Njogu Demba-Nyrén – Brann – 2008
Tijan Jaiteh – Brann, Sandnes Ulf – 2007–12, 2014
Saihou Sarr – Mjøndalen – 1976–81
Sheriff Sinyan – Lillestrøm, Molde – 2016, 2019, 2020-
Ebrima Sohna – Sandefjord – 2007, 2009–10
Alagie Sosseh – Mjøndalen – 2015
Pa Dembo Touray – Vålerenga – 2004

Georgia
Giorgi Gorozia – Stabæk – 2014–17
Levan Melkadze – Vålerenga – 2006

Germany
Sascha Burchert – Vålerenga – 2015
Jonas Deumeland – Start – 2018, 2020
Lennart Grill – Brann – 2021
Hendrik Helmke – Tromsø – 2013
Stefan Jambo – Strømsgodset – 1990
René Klingbeil – Viking – 2007–08
Andreas Mayer – Stabæk, Rosenborg – 1996–99
Sascha Mockenhaupt – Bodø/Glimt – 2016
Heinz Müller – Odd Grenland, Lillestrøm – 2004–07
Kristian Nicht – Viking – 2008–09
Jérome Polenz – Sarpsborg 08 – 2014
Claus Reitmaier – Lillestrøm – 2005–06
Uwe Rösler – Lillestrøm – 2002–03
Sebastian Schindzielorz – Start – 2005
Thomas Sobotzik – Sandefjord – 2007

Ghana
Mohammed Abu – Strømsgodset, Vålerenga – 2010–11, 2012, 2014–17, 2018, 2019–20
Richard Ackon – Stabæk – 1997–2001
Paul Addo – Odd Grenland − 2011–13
Dominic Adiyiah – Fredrikstad – 2008–10
Bismark Adjei-Boateng – Strømsgodset – 2012–17
Enoch Kofi Adu – Stabæk – 2014
David Agbo – Kristiansund – 2022–
Ernest Agyiri – Vålerenga – 2016–18
Abdul Karim Ahmed – Kongsvinger, Viking – 1998–2001, 2002
Anthony Annan – Start, Stabæk, Rosenborg – 2007–11, 2015
Isaac Annan – Kristiansund – 2022–
Denny Antwi – Start – 2016–18
Kwesi Appiah – Viking – 2017
Ernest Asante – Start, Stabæk – 2011, 2013–16
Isaac Boakye – Vålerenga – 2011
Robert Boateng – Rosenborg – 1997–2000
Afo Dodoo – Tromsø – 1999
Shadrach Eghan – Stabæk – 2016
King Gyan – Viking – 2011–13
Edwin Gyasi – Aalesund – 2016–17
Raymond Gyasi – Stabæk – 2017–19
Zakari Hamza – Tromsø – 2013
Michael Helegbe – Brann – 2005
Kamal Issah – Stabæk – 2015–16
Mohammed-Awal Issah – Rosenborg – 2011
Kwame Karikari – Haugesund – 2016
Gilbert Koomson – Sogndal, Brann, Bodø/Glimt – 2013, 2016–17, 2018–20, 2021–
Patrick Kpozo – Tromsø – 2017
Enock Kwakwa – Strømsgodset – 2012–13
Adam Larsen Kwarasey – Strømsgodset, Rosenborg, Vålerenga – 2007–14, 2016, 2017–19
Derrick Mensah – Haugesund – 2016–17
Ibrahim Mensah – Start – 2018
Divine Naah – Strømsgodset – 2014
Alex Nyarko – Start – 2005
Mahatma Otoo – Sogndal – 2013–17
Solomon Owusu – Odd – 2021–
Razak Nuhu – Strømsgodset – 2011–14
Razak Pimpong – Viking, Aalesund – 2007–09, 2008
Isaac Twum – Start, Mjøndalen – 2018, 2020–21

Guatemala
Nicholas Hagen – Ham-Kam – 2022–

Guinea
Ousmane Camara – Vålerenga – 2019–20
Amadou Diallo – Jerv – 2022–
Mikael Dyrestam – Aalesund, Sarpsborg 08 – 2014–15, 2020–21
Mai Traore – Viking – 2021–

Guinea-Bissau
Francisco Júnior – Strømsgodset – 2014, 2016–18

Honduras
Mario Martínez – Vålerenga – 2009
Reinieri Mayorquín – Aalesund – 2009
Maynor Suazo – Brann – 2006

Hungary
Zsolt Korcsmár – Brann – 2010–13
Péter Kovács – Tromsø, Viking, Strømsgodset, Odd Grenland, Sarpsborg 08, Sandefjord – 2002–07, 2009–10, 2012–15, 2017
Balázs Nikolov – Ham-Kam – 2006
Tamás Szekeres – Strømsgodset, Tromsø, Fredrikstad – 2001, 2005–06, 2006–07
Mihály Tóth – Fredrikstad – 2005–07

Iceland
Arnór Sveinn Aðalsteinsson – Hønefoss – 2012–13
Steinar Dagur Adolfsson – Kongsvinger – 1999
Axel Óskar Andrésson – Viking – 2019–20
Árni Gautur Arason – Rosenborg, Vålerenga, Odd Grenland – 1998–03, 2004–07, 2008–10
Adam Örn Arnarson – Aalesund, Tromsø – 2016–17, 2021
Ásgeir Börkur Ásgeirsson – Sarpsborg 08 – 2013
Marel Baldvinsson – Stabæk, Molde – 2000–02, 2006
Birkir Bjarnason – Bodø/Glimt, Viking – 2006–07, 2008–10
Brynjar Ingi Bjarnason – Vålerenga – 2022–
Ólafur Örn Bjarnason – Brann – 2004–10
Teddy Bjarnason – Lyn – 2008–09
Ármann Smári Björnsson – Lillestrøm, Brann – 2000, 2002, 2006–09
Haraldur Björnsson – Lillestrøm – 2016
Jón Daði Böðvarsson – Viking – 2013-15
Ríkharður Daðason – Viking, Lillestrøm, 1998–2000, 2002–03
Einar Daníelsson – Lillestrøm – 2000
Gylfi Einarsson – Lillestrøm, Brann – 2001–04, 2008–10
Bjarni Ólafur Eiríksson – Stabæk – 2010–12
Hólmar Örn Eyjólfsson – Rosenborg – 2014–17, 2020–21
Kjartan Finnbogason – Sandefjord – 2009
Kristján Finnbogason – Start – 2018
Jón Guðni Fjóluson – Brann – 2020
Hólmbert Friðjónsson – Aalesund, Lillestrøm – 2020, 2022–
Samúel Friðjónsson – Vålerenga, Viking – 2017–18, 2019–
Gunnar Gíslason – Moss – 1987–88
Stefán Gíslason – Strømsgodset, Lyn, Viking, Lillestrøm – 1999–2001, 2005–07, 2010–11
Valur Gíslason – Strømsgodset – 1998–99
Daníel Leó Grétarsson – Aalesund – 2015–17, 2020
Eiður Guðjohnsen – Molde – 2016
Haraldur Freyr Guðmundsson – Aalesund, Start – 2005–09, 2011
Jóhann Guðmundsson – Lyn – 2001–03
Tryggvi Guðmundsson – Tromsø, Stabæk – 1998–2000, 2001–03
Brynjar Gunnarsson – Vålerenga, Moss – 1998
Patrik Gunnarsson – Viking – 2021–
Veigar Páll Gunnarsson – Strømsgodset, Stabæk, Vålerenga – 2001, 2004, 2006–11
Bjarki Gunnlaugsson – Molde, Brann – 1997–99
Ágúst Gylfason – Brann – 1995–98
Hannes Þór Halldórsson – Brann, Sandnes Ulf, Bodø/Glimt – 2012, 2014–15, 2016
Emil Hallfreðsson – Lyn – 2007
Jóhannes Harðarson – Start – 2005–07
Óskar Örn Hauksson – Sogndal, Sandnes Ulf – 2003, 2012
Auðun Helgason – Viking – 1998–2000
Elfar Freyr Helgason – Stabæk – 2012
Guðni Rúnar Helgason – Start – 2002
Heiðar Helguson – Lillestrøm – 1998–99
Grétar Hjartarson – Lillestrøm – 2000
Andrés Már Jóhannesson – Haugesund – 2011–12
Sverrir Ingi Ingason – Viking – 2014
Valdimar Þór Ingimundarson – Strømsgodset – 2020–21
Garðar Jóhannsson – Fredrikstad, Strømsgodset – 2007–10
Viðar Ari Jónsson – Brann, Sandefjord – 2017, 2020-21
Gunnlaugur Jónsson – Kongsvinger – 1998
Ingvar Jónsson – Start, Sandefjord – 2015, 2017–18
Kristinn Jónsson – Sarpsborg 08, Sogndal – 2016–17
Sævar Jónsson – Brann – 1986
Óttar Magnús Karlsson – Molde – 2017
Viðar Örn Kjartansson – Vålerenga – 2014, 2020–
Birkir Kristinsson – Brann – 1996–97
Rúnar Kristinsson – Lillestrøm – 1997–2000
Guðmundur Kristjánsson – Start – 2013–16
Ari Leifsson – Strømsgodset – 2020-
Stefán Logi Magnússon – Lillestrøm – 2009–12
Finnur Orri Margeirsson – Lillestrøm – 2015
Pétur Marteinsson – Stabæk – 1999–2001
Davíð Kristján Ólafsson – Aalesund – 2020
Elías Már Ómarsson – Vålerenga – 2015–17
Orri Sigurður Ómarsson – Sarpsborg 08 – 2018–19
Pálmi Rafn Pálmason – Stabæk, Lillestrøm – 2008–11, 2012–14
Emil Pálsson – Sandefjord, Sarpsborg 08 – 2018, 2020, 2021– 
Arnar Darri Pétursson – Lyn – 2009
Guðmundur Pétursson – Sandefjord – 2007
Alfons Sampsted – Bodø/Glimt – 2020–
Eiður Sigurbjörnsson – Sandnes Ulf – 2014
Oliver Sigurjónsson – Bodø/Glimt – 2019
Aron Sigurðarson – Tromsø, Start – 2016–18
Björn Bergmann Sigurðarson – Lillestrøm, Molde – 2009–12, 2014, 2016–17, 2021–
Bjarni Sigurðsson – Brann – 1985–88, 1994
Hannes Sigurðsson – Viking, Sandnes Ulf – 2002–05, 2007–08, 2014
Helgi Sigurðsson – Stabæk, Lyn – 1997–99, 2001–03
Indriði Sigurðsson – Lillestrøm, Lyn, Viking – 2000–03, 2006–09, 2009–15
Kristján Örn Sigurðsson – Brann, Hønefoss – 2005–10, 2012-13
Andri Sigþórsson – Molde – 2001–03
Arnór Smárason – Lillestrøm – 2018–19
Ólafur Stígsson – Molde – 2002–03
Hörður Sveinsson – Tromsø – 2007
Björn Daníel Sverrisson – Viking – 2014–16
Birkir Már Sævarsson – Brann – 2008–13
Guðmundur Þórarinsson – Sarpsborg 08, Rosenborg – 2013–14, 2016
Ólafur Þórðarson – Brann, Lyn – 1989–92
Stefán Þórðarson – Brann, Kongsvinger – 1998, 1999
Bjarni Þorsteinsson – Molde – 2001–03
Steinþór Freyr Þorsteinsson – Sandnes Ulf, Viking – 2012–13, 2014–15
Gunnar Heiðar Þorvaldsson – Vålerenga – 2007–08
Aron Elís Þrándarson – Aalesund – 2015–17
Dagur Dan Thórhallsson – Mjøndalen – 2020
Arnór Ingvi Traustason – Sandnes Ulf – 2012
Guðbjörn Tryggvason – Start – 1985
Þórarinn Ingi Valdimarsson – Sarpsborg 08 – 2013–14
Hjörtur Logi Valgarðsson – Sogndal – 2014
Arnar Viðarsson – Lillestrøm – 1998
Davíð Viðarsson – Lillestrøm – 2002–04
Árni Vilhjálmsson – Lillestrøm – 2015–17
Matthías Vilhjálmsson – Start, Rosenborg, Vålerenga – 2013–15, 2015–18, 2019–20 
Brynjólfur Willumsson – Kristiansund – 2021–

India
Gurpreet Singh Sandhu – Stabæk – 2016–17

Iran
Arash Talebinejad – Tromsø – 2006
Aram Khalili – Start – 2006–07, 2009
Sosha Makani – Strømsgodset, Mjøndalen – 2017, 2020-2021

Israel
Dan Alberto Fellus – Vålerenga, Lillestrøm – 2006, 2007–09

Italy
Michele Di Piedi – Odd Grenland – 2002
Arnold Schwellensattl – Start – 2005

Ivory Coast
Davy Angan – Lyn, Hønefoss, Molde – 2008–09, 2010, 2011–12
Daouda Bamba – Kristiansund, Brann – 2017–18, 2018–21
Kevin Beugré – Hønefoss – 2010, 2012–13
Franck Boli – Stabæk, Aalesund – 2012–15, 2016–19
Mathis Bolly – Lillestrøm, Stabæk, Molde – 2008–12, 2021, 2019–
Vamouti Diomande – Sandefjord, Mjøndalen – 2010, 2015, 2019
Franck Dja Djédjé – Sarpsborg 08 – 2014
Constant Djakpa – Sogndal – 2006–07
Victorien Djedje – Haugesund – 2008–10
Alhassane Dosso – Lillestrøm – 2009–11
Ahyee Aye Elvis – Sogndal – 2004, 2011–12
Datro Fofana – Molde – 2021–
Ismaël Fofana – Fredrikstad – 2007
Moryké Fofana – Lillestrøm – 2012–15
Boti Goa – Rosenborg – 2011
Ghislain Guessan – Viking – 2017
Barry Kader – Sogndal – 2011
Benjamin Karamoko – Haugesund, Aalesund, Sarpsborg 08 – 2018, 2020, 2021
Luc Kassi – Stabæk – 2012, 2014–17, 2019–20
Aboubakar Keita – Stabæk – 2018
Konan Kouadio – Fredrikstad – 2007
Raoul Kouakou – Sogndal, Sandefjord – 2002–04, 2007
Sayouba Mandé – Stabæk – 2012, 2014–18
Didier Ya Konan – Rosenborg – 2007–09
Jean Stéphane Yao Yao – Lyn – 2009

Jamaica
Rodolph Austin – Brann – 2008–11
Deshorn Brown – Vålerenga – 2015–16
Duwayne Kerr – Sarpsborg 08 – 2013–15
Damion Lowe – Start – 2017–18
Jason Morrison – Strømsgodset, Aalesund – 2010–13
Demar Phillips – Aalesund – 2009–14
Adrian Reid – Lillestrøm, Vålerenga – 2009, 2011
Dane Richards – Bodø/Glimt – 2014
Luton Shelton – Vålerenga – 2008, 2009–11
Khari Stephenson – Aalesund – 2008–10
Tremaine Stewart – Aalesund – 2012–14

Japan
Kosuke Kinoshita – Stabæk – 2019–21
Daigo Kobayashi – Stabæk – 2009

Kenya
Robert Mambo Mumba – Viking – 2005–06
Valdo Nyabaro – Start – 2000, 2002
Arnold Origi – Fredrikstad, Lillestrøm – 2011, 2013–17

Kosovo
Bajram Ajeti – Lillestrøm – 2017
Besart Berisha – Rosenborg – 2008
Zymer Bytyqi – Sandnes Ulf, Viking – 2012–17, 2019–20
Erton Fejzullahu – Sarpsborg 08 – 2017
Ardian Gashi – Molde, Vålerenga, Brann, Fredrikstad, Odd – 2001, 2003–09, 2014–17
Ylldren Ibrahimaj – Viking, Lillestrøm – 2019–20, 2022– 
Flamur Kastrati – Strømsgodset, Aalesund, Sandefjord, Kristiansund, Odd – 2013–16, 2016, 2017–18, 2018–21, 2021– 
Kreshnik Krasniqi – Strømsgodset – 2020–
Avni Pepa – Start, Sandnes Ulf – 2010–14
Elbasan Rashani – Odd, Rosenborg – 2010–14, 2016–17, 2017–20
Anel Rashkaj – Sandnes Ulf – 2012–14
Lum Rexhepi – Lillestrøm – 2015
Herolind Shala – Odd, Start, Vålerenga, Stabæk – 2011–14, 2018, 2019–20, 2021

Latvia
Jānis Ikaunieks – Strømsgodset – 2020

Lebanon
Adnan Haidar – Vålerenga, Stabæk – 2008, 2010–12
Bassel Jradi – Strømsgodset, Lillestrøm – 2014–18
Felix Michel Melki – Sarpsborg 08 – 2020

Liberia
Willis Forko – Bodø/Glimt – 2008–09
Dulee Johnson – Start – 2016
Sam Johnson, Vålerenga – 2018
Amadaiya Rennie – Brann – 2015

Libya
Éamon Zayed – Aalesund – 2005

Lithuania
Ričardas Beniušis – Start – 2002
Tadas Labukas – Brann – 2011
Tomas Ražanauskas – Brann – 2000–01
Andrius Velička – Viking – 2008
Donatas Vencevičius – Start – 2002

Luxembourg
Lars Krogh Gerson – Kongsvinger, Brann – 2010, 2021

Malawi
John Maduka – Strindheim – 1995
Francis Songo – Strindheim – 1995

Mali
Ismaila Coulibaly – Sarpsborg 08 – 2019–20
Ibrahima Koné – Haugesund, Sarpsborg 08 – 2018–20, 2021
Aboubacar Konté – Sarpsborg 08 – 2019–2020
Yacouba Sylla – Strømsgodset – 2019

Malta
Michael Mifsud – Lillestrøm – 2004–06

Mexico
Efraín Juárez – Vålerenga – 2019

Montenegro
 – Sarpsborg – 2011
Dino Islamović – Rosenborg – 2020–21

Morocco
Abderrazak Hamdallah – Aalesund – 2013
El Mehdi Karnass – Aalesund – 2014
Kamal Saaliti – Vålerenga, Hønefoss, Sandnes Ulf – 1998–2001, 2010, 2012
Houcine Zaidoun – Aalesund – 2013

Namibia
Mohammed Ouseb – Lyn – 2001–03
Oliver Risser – Lyn – 2009

Netherlands
Rodney Antwi – Jerv – 2022–
Leandro Fernandes – Jerv – 2022–
Boudewijn de Geer – Molde, Lillestrøm – 1977–79
Dennis Iliohan – Stabæk – 2001
Quint Jansen – Mjøndalen, Sandefjord – 2019–20, 2022–
Daan Klinkenberg – Aalesund – 2020
Barry Maguire – Sarpsborg 08 – 2015
Ludcinio Marengo – Brann – 2017–19
Darren Maatsen – Stabæk – 2020
Beau Molenaar – Haugesund – 2008–10
Shayne Pattynama – Viking – 2021–
Kaj Ramsteijn – Aalesund – 2017
Michael Timisela – Lillestrøm – 2015
Edwin van Ankeren – Odd Grenland – 2000–03
Crescendo van Berkel – Sandefjord – 2017–18
Ian Smeulers – Sandefjord – 2021–
Joshua Smits – Bodø/Glimt – 2020-
Shaquill Sno – Aalesund – 2020
Bart Straalman – Sarpsborg 08 – 2019
Vito Wormgoor – Aalesund, Brann – 2016–19

New Zealand
Joe Bell – Viking – 2020–21
Craig Henderson – Stabæk, Mjøndalen – 2014–15

Nigeria
Suleiman Abdullahi – Viking – 2015–16
Oluwasegun Abiodun – Ham-Kam – 2004–06, 2008
Adamu Abubakar – Haugesund – 2015
Akor Adams – Lillestrøm – 2022–
Samuel Adegbenro – Viking, Rosenborg – 2015–17, 2017–20
Felix Ademola – Skeid, Haugesund, Ham-Kam – 1997, 2000
Aremu Afeez – Start – 2018, 2020
Adeleke Akinyemi – Start – 2018, 2020
Izuchuckwu Anthony – Haugesund – 2016–18
Ugonna Anyora – Haugesund – 2010–14
Raphael Ayagwa – Lillestrøm – 2018–19
Ezekiel Bala – Lyn – 2005–07, 
Effiom Otu Bassey – Lillestrøm – 2011
Bentley – Odd, Brann – 2007–12, 2014–17
Victor Boniface – Bodø/Glimt – 2019–
Dominic Chatto – Bodø/Glimt – 2014–15
John Chibuike – Rosenborg – 2011–14
Osita Henry Chikere – Viking – 2013–15
Daniel Chima Chukwu – Molde – 2010–13, 2018
Babajide David Akintola – Haugesund, Rosenborg – 2018, 2019
Moses Ebiye – Lillestrøm, Tromsø – 2017–19, 2021–
Chidera Ejuke – Vålerenga – 2017–19
Thompson Ekpe – Molde, Kristiansund – 2016–17
Emmanuel Ekpo – Molde, Haugesund – 2012–14
Charles Ezeh – Lillestrøm – 2017–18
Edwin Eziyodawe – Lillestrøm – 2009–10
Fred Friday – Lillestrøm, Strømsgodset – 2013–16, 2021–
Bala Garba – Haugesund, Start – 1997–98, 2000, 2005–06
Hilary Gong – Haugesund – 2022–
Abubakar Ibrahim – Start – 2017–218
Shuaibu Ibrahim – Haugesund, Mjøndalen – 2016–19, 2020-21
Uduak Cyril Idemokon – Start – 2016–17
Odion Ighalo – Lyn – 2007–08
Emanuell Igiebor – Lillestrøm – 2009–11
Stanley Ihugba – Lyn, Sarpsborg 08 – 2009, 2011
Peter Ijeh – Viking – 2006–09
Anthony Ikedi – Haugesund – 2017, 2018–19
Austin Ikenna – Start – 2015–17
Bonke Innocent – Lillestrøm – 2014–17
Henry Isaac – Sandefjord – 2006
Taofeek Ismaheel – Vålerenga – 2022–
Ipalibo Jack – Strømsgodset – 2019–
Leke James – Aalesund, Molde – 2012–16, 2018–2020
Kachi – Sarpsborg 08, Odd – 2015–16, 2020– 
Jordan Attah Kadiri – Strømsgodset – 2021
Akeem Latifu – Strømsgodset, Aalesund, Mjøndalen – 2010, 2013, 2014–15, 2019
Ifeanyi Mathew – Lillestrøm – 2016–19, 2021–
Peter Godly Michael – Vålerenga – 2018
Mikel John Obi – Lyn – 2005
Chidiebere Nwakali – Start, Sogndal – 2016, 2017
Henry Nwosu – Sandefjord – 2006
Paul Obiefule – Lyn, Hønefoss, Lillestrøm – 2007–11
Chinedu Obasi – Lyn – 2005–07
Simon Ogar – Bodø/Glimt – 2006
Igoh Ogbu – Lillestrøm – 2021–
Edward Ofere – Sogndal – 2014
Fegor Ogude – Vålerenga – 2010–13
Mobi Okoli – Sandnes Ulf – 2010–12
Solomon Okoronkwo – Aalesund – 2011–12
Aaron Samuel Olanare – Vålerenga, Sarpsborg 08 – 2012–13, 2013–14
Kim Ojo – Brann – 2011
Seyi Olofinjana – Brann, Start – 2003–04, 2014
Oladapo Olufemi – Start – 2009–10
Solomon Owello – Start – 2008–15
Ganiyu Owolabi – Viking – 1997
Uche Sabastine – Stabæk – 2021
Usman Sale – Viking – 2016–17, 2019
Ahmed Suleiman – Vålerenga – 2012–13
Marco Tagbajumi – Strømsgodset, Lillestrøm, Bodø/Glimt – 2015,  2017–18
William Troost-Ekong – Haugesund – 2015–16
Aniekpeno Udoh – Viking – 2016–17
Anthony Ujah – Lillestrøm – 2010
Mohammed Usman – Sarpsborg 08 – 2018–19
Izunna Uzochukwu – Aalesund – 2020
George White – Odd – 2011–13
Sad'eeq Yusuf – Haugesund – 2015

Northern Ireland
Kyle Lafferty – Sarpsborg 08 – 2019
Neil Masters – Moss – 2001–02
Neil Matthews – Sogndal – 1992
Robin Shroot – Sogndal, Viking – 2015, 2017

North Macedonia
Edmir Asani – Lillestrøm – 2004
Stefan Aškovski – Strømsgodset – 2014
Jasmin Mecinović – Sogndal – 2012
Daniel Mojsov – Brann – 2013–14
David Mitov Nilsson – Sarpsborg 08 – 2020
Aleksandar Vasilev – 2010–11
Leonard Zuta – Vålerenga – 2021–

Oman
Ali Al-Habsi – Lyn – 2003–05

Paraguay
Nery Cardozo – Viking – 2012

Poland
Zygmunt Anczok – Skeid – 1977–79
Marek Filipczak – Brann – 1990–92
Jarosław Fojut – Tromsø – 2013–14
Łukasz Jarosiński – Strømsgodset – 2015–17
Radosław Janukiewicz – Strømsgodset – 2017
Jerzy Kowalik – Tromsø – 1992
Janusz Kudyba – Lyn – 1991
Piotr Leciejewski – Brann – 2011–14, 2016–17
Sebastian Mila – Vålerenga – 2007
Marek Motyka – Brann – 1990
Jakub Serafin – Haugesund – 2017–18
Kazimierz Sokołowski – Tromsø – 1992–94
Tomasz Stolpa – Tromsø – 2004, 2006
Marcel Wawrzynkiewicz – Vålerenga – 2013

Portugal
Daniel Fernandes – Lillestrøm – 2017
Nuno Marques – Lyn – 2004–05
João Meira – Vålerenga – 2018
Tomás Podstawski – Stabæk – 2021
Joshua Silva – Bodø/Glimt – 2015

Republic of Ireland
John Devine – Start – 1987, 1989
Gary Hogan – Sandefjord – 2015 
Ciarán Martyn – Fredrikstad – 2007
Mike McCabe – Tromsø, Viking – 1988–90, 1991–93
Sean McDermott – Sandnes Ulf, Kristiansund – 2012–13, 2017–

Romania
Dorian Stefan – Vålerenga – 1990
Dumitru Moraru – Start – 1990–91

Russia
Dmitri Barannik – Strømsgodset – 1995–97
Nikita Khaykin – Bodø/Glimt – 2019–
Yevgeni Kirisov – Stabæk – 2015
Vadim Manzon – Bodø/Glimt – 2016
Vasili Pavlov – Brann – 2013
Igor Pyvin – Strindheim – 1995
Aleksandr Vasyutin – Sarpsborg 08 – 2018–19
Aleksei Yeryomenko – Tromsø – 1998

Rwanda
Olivier Karekezi – Ham-Kam – 2008

Scotland
Arthur Albiston – Molde – 1992–93
Alex Davey – Stabæk – 2016
Paul Kane – Viking – 1996
Liam Henderson – Rosenborg – 2015
Steven Lennon – Sandnes Ulf – 2013–14
Jim McCalliog – Lyn – 1978
Charlie Miller – Brann – 2004–06
Lee Robertson – Start, Molde, Bodø/Glimt – 1996–2000, 2002
Maurice Ross – Viking – 2007–08
Robbie Winters – Brann – 2002–08

Senegal
Stéphane Badji – Sogndal, Brann – 2012, 2013–14
Badou – Bodø/Glimt – 2014–15
Victor Demba Bindia – Sandefjord – 2009–10, 2015, 2017–18
Ousseynou Boye – Mjøndalen – 2015
Abdou Karim Camara – Molde – 2011–12
Aliou Coly – Molde, Kristiansund – 2013, 2017–
Saliou Ciss – Tromsø – 2010–13
Ousseynou Cavin Diagné – Kristiansund – 2020
Mamadou Diallo – Lillestrøm, Vålerenga – 1997–99
Papa Maly Diamanka – Vålerenga – 2012
Krépin Diatta – Sarpsborg 08 – 2017–18
Mamadou Diaw – Aalesund – 2020, 2022–
Simon Diedhiou – Haugesund – 2015
Mamadou Diagne Latyr – Fredrikstad – 2004
Amidou Diop – Molde, Mjøndalen, Kristiansund – 2014–17, 2015, 2017–
Mame Biram Diouf – Molde – 2008–09
Mignane Diouf – Tromsø – 2010
Pape Paté Diouf – Molde, Odd – 2006, 2008–11, 2012, 2014–17
Medhi Dioury – Tromsø – 2017
Ibrahima Dramé – Brann – 2014–15
Baye Djiby Fall – Molde – 2010
Mouhamed Gueye – Fredrikstad – 2012
El-Hadji Gana Kane – Sandefjord – 2017–18
Madiou Konate – Molde, Hønefoss – 2005–06, 2010
Malick Mané – Sandefjord, Sogndal – 2009–10, 2012–14
Serigne Mor Mbaye – Kristiansund – 2019–
Kara Mbodj – Tromsø – 2010–11
Abdoulaye M'baye – Tromsø, Vålerenga, Aalesund – 2000–01, 2003, 2005
Remond Mendy – Hønefoss – 2012–13
Laurent Mendy – Sarpsborg 08 – 2021–
Mouhamadou Moustapha N'Diaye – Bodø/Glimt – 2014
Alioune Ndour – Haugesund – 2021–
El Hadj Sega Ngom – Tromsø – 2011
Mame Niang – Viking, Kongsvinger – 2008–09, 2010
Oumar Niasse – Brann – 2012
Sidy Sagna – Sogndal – 2013
Elhadji Mour Samb – Tromsø – 2017–18
Vieux Sané – Tromsø, Bodø/Glimt, Brann – 2011, 2014–15, 2021
Babacar Sarr – Start, Sogndal, Molde – 2013–14, 2014, 2016, 2016–18
Makhtar Thioune – Molde, Viking – 2009–11, 2012–15
Ibrahima Wadji – Molde, Haugesund – 2017–18, 2018–21

Serbia
Stefan Antonijevic – Lillestrøm – 2017–18
Stevan Bates – Tromsø – 2010
Stefan Čupić – Sarpsborg 08 – 2017–18
Dušan Cvetinović – Haugesund – 2013–16
Đorđe Denić – Rosenborg – 2018–
Nikola Djurdjic – Haugesund – 2010–11
Gojko Ivković – Viking – 2008–10
Petar Golubović – Aalesund – 2022–
Milan Jevtović – Bodø/Glimt, Rosenborg, Odd – 2016, 2017, 2021–
Nemanja Jovanović – Sandnes Ulf – 2013
Nikola Komazec – Haugesund – 2014–15
Aleksandar Kovačević – Haugesund – 2017–18
Miloš Mihajlov – Sandnes Ulf – 2013
Branislav Miličević – Start – 2009–10
Nenad Novaković – Aalesund – 2008
Zoran Popović – Bodø/Glimt – 2018
Aleksandar Prijović – Tromsø – 2012–13
Nenad Srećković – Fredrikstad – 2012
Nemanja Tubić – Haugesund – 2016
Srđan Urošević – Ham-Kam – 2008
Bojan Zajić – Vålerenga, Sarpsborg 08 – 2007–13, 2014–15

Sierra Leone
Umaru Bangura – Hønefoss, Haugesund – 2010–13
Khalifa Jabbie – Fredrikstad – 2011–13
Lennox Kanu – Viking – 2002
Mustapha Sama – Haugesund – 2001–02
Sheriff Suma – Haugesund – 2008
Alfred Sankoh – Strømsgodset – 2006–10, 2010–13

Slovakia
Martin Husár – Lillestrøm, HamKam – 2006–09
Filip Kiss – Haugesund – 2015–17
Tomáš Malec – Rosenborg, Lillestrøm – 2014–15, 2016–17
Ivan Mesík – Stabæk, Odd – 2021, 2022–
Josef Miso – Sandefjord – 2006
Marek Sapara – Rosenborg – 2006–09

Slovenia
David Brekalo – Viking – 2021–
Mitja Brulc – Molde – 2004–05
Rok Elsner – Haugesund – 2010, 2014
Robert Koren – Lillestrøm – 2004–06
Matej Mavrič – Molde – 2004–06
Denis Selimović – Aalesund – 2007–09
Filip Valenčič – Stabæk – 2018, 2020
Slobodan Vuk – Tromsø – 2017–18
Janez Zavrl – Brann – 2006

Somalia
Eise Aden Abshir – Lillestrøm – 2006–08
Mohammed Ahamed – Tromsø, Sarpsborg 08 – 2009–12, 2011

South Africa
Keanin Ayer – Sandefjord – 2022–
Emile Baron – Lillestrøm – 1999–2004
Mbulelo Mabizela – Vålerenga – 2005
Thabang Molefe – Lyn – 2002
Toni Nhleko – Brann, Viking, Sandefjord – 2002–03, 2005–06, 2007
MacBeth Sibaya – Rosenborg – 2002
Lars Veldwijk – Aalesund – 2017

South Korea
Cha Ji-ho – Lyn – 2004

Spain
Godwin Antwi – Bodø/Glimt – 2013
Álvaro Baigorri – Sarpsborg 08 – 2013
Fernando Blanco – Brann – 1971
Marcos Celorrio – Sandefjord – 2020–21
José Cruz – Viking – 2017
Flaco – Molde – 1992–93, 1995
José Isidoro – Bodø/Glimt – 2018–19
Adrià Mateo López – Ranheim – 2019
Rufo – Sandefjord – 2018, 2020 
Enric Vallès – Sandefjord – 2017–18, 2020–21 
Pau Morer Vicente – Sandefjord – 2015, 2017–18

Sweden

Peter Abelsson – Viking – 2006–08
Joakim Alexandersson – Aalesund – 2007
Simon Alexandersson – Kristiansund – 2018
Andreas Alm – Kongsvinger – 1998–99
John Alvbåge – Stabæk – 2017
Adam Andersson – Rosenborg – 2021–
Björn Andersson – Viking – 2011–12
Christoffer Andersson – Lillestrøm – 2004–06
Johan Andersson – Stabæk, Lillestrøm – 2008–11, 2012–15
Mattias Andersson – Strømsgodset, Fredrikstad, Odd Grenland – 2007–10
Mikael Andersson – Sandefjord – 2006–07
Marcus Andreasson – Bryne, Molde – 2001–06, 2008–10
Filip Apelstav – Kongsvinger, Sogndal – 1999, 2001
Daniel Arnefjord – Aalesund – 2008–10
Johan Arneng – Vålerenga, Aalesund – 2002, 2008–10
Jesper Arvidsson – Vålerenga – 2016
Mattias Asper – Viking – 2006
Jeffrey Aubynn – Aalesund – 2006
Jonathan Augustinsson – Rosenborg – 2021–
Andreas Augustsson – Vålerenga – 1999–2000
Jakob Augustsson – Lyn – 2001–03
Stefan Bärlin – Start, Odd Grenland – 2005–08
Joseph Baffo – Vålerenga – 2013
Abgar Barsom – Fredrikstad – 2008–09
Hans Berggren – Haugesund – 2000
Marcus Bergholtz – Stabæk – 2011
Fredrik Berglund – Stabæk – 2009
Doug Bergqvist – Haugesund – 2019
Jacob Bergström – Mjøndalen – 2019
Valmir Berisha – Aalesund – 2017
Mattias Bjärsmyr – Rosenborg – 2010–11
Fredrik Björck – Tromsø – 2010–11
Carl Björk – Aalesund – 2013–14, 2015
Joachim Björklund – Brann – 1990–92
Per Blohm – Viking – 1997–98
Anders Blomquist – Haugesund – 2000
Martin Broberg – Odd – 2017–19
Ulf Camitz – Strømsgodset – 1991
Tobias Carlsson – Molde – 2001–03
Lars-Gunnar Carlstrand – Strømsgodset – 1998
Paweł Cibicki – Molde – 2018
 – Sandefjord – 2006
Bobbie da Cruz – Kongsvinger – 2010
Henrik Dahl – Lyn – 2004–06
Erik Dahlin – Sogndal − 2013–14
Johan Dahlin – Lyn – 2006–07, 2008–09
Erdin Demir – Brann – 2012–14
Panajotis Dimitriadis – Sandefjord – 2010
Mikael Dorsin – Rosenborg – 2004–07, 2008–16
Pontus Engblom – Haugesund, Strømsgodset, Sandefjord – 2012–14, 2017–18
Ludwig Ernstsson – Kongsvinger – 1997–98
Kaj Eskelinen – Brann – 1993
David Fällman – Aalesund – 2022–
Pontus Farnerud – Stabæk – 2008–11
Edier Frejd – Kongsvinger, Sandnes Ulf – 2010, 2012–14
Anders Friberg – Bryne – 2000–01
Lennart Fridh – Brann – 1991
Pierre Gallo – Bryne – 2001–03
Fredrik Gärdeman – Stabæk, Vålerenga, Skeid – 1993–96, 1997–98
Patrik Gerrbrand – Fredrikstad – 2006–09
Tobias Grahn – Vålerenga – 2002–03
Fredrik Gustafson – Molde – 2002–03
Eddie Gustafsson – Molde, Ham-Kam, Lyn – 2002–08
Kenneth Gustafsson – Lyn – 2001
Daniel Gustavsson – Lillestrøm – 2019, 2021
Andreas Haddad – Lillestrøm – 2005–06
Colo Halit – Lyn – 2004
Melker Hallberg – Vålerenga – 2015
Johan Hammarström – Kongsvinger – 1997–98
Marcus Hansson – Tromsø – 2015
Patrik Hansson – Brann – 1992–93
Sebastian Henriksson – Odd Grenland – 2003–05
Göran Holter – Brann – 1991–92
Patrik Ingelsten – Viking – 2010, 2012–13
Stefan Ishizaki – Vålerenga – 2005
Erik Israelsson – Vålerenga – 2018–19
Jens Jacobsson – Tromsø – 2016
Dime Jankulovski – Start – 2002
Jesper Jansson – Stabæk – 1997–99, 2006
Emil Johansson – Molde, Sandnes Ulf – 2010, 2014
Magnus Johansson – Brann, Haugesund – 1993–98
Kjell Jonevret – Viking – 1988–90
Jonas Jonsson – Brann – 2002–03
Markus Jonsson – Brann – 2012–13
Kevin Kabran – Start, Viking – 2018, 2020, 2021– 
Liridon Kalludra – Sarpsborg 08, Kristiansund – 2015, 2017–
Bovar Karim – Tromsø – 2007
Markus Karlsson – Stabæk – 2006
Benjamin Kibebe – Tromsø, Aalesund – 2005–08
Anders Kiel – Moss – 1998
Magnus Kihlberg – Lillestrøm, Molde, Aalesund – 1997–2005, 2007
Magnus Kihlstedt – Lillestrøm, Brann – 1997–2001
Anton Kralj – Sandefjord – 2020
William Kurtovic – Sandefjord – 2015, 2017–18, 2020– 
Andreas Landgren – Fredrikstad – 2011, 2012–14
Thomas Lagerlöf – Lyn – 2002–04
Benny Lekström – Tromsø – 2012–13, 2015
Jonathan Levi – Rosenborg – 2017–18
Axel Lindahl – Bodø/Glimt – 2021
Peter Lindau – Strømsgodset – 2001
Jonas Lindberg – Sarpsborg 08 – 2016–18
Andreas Linde – Molde – 2015–21
Rasmus Lindkvist – Vålerenga – 2014–17
Tobias Linderoth – Stabæk – 1999–2001
Stefan Lindqvist – Strømsgodset – 1998
David Ljung – Molde – 2001–04
Jesper Löfgren – Brann – 2021
Johnny Lundberg – Sandnes Ulf – 2013
Robert Lundström – Vålerenga – 2015–18
Fredric Lundqvist – Viking – 2005–06
Mikael Lustig – Rosenborg – 2008–11
Peter Magnusson – Sandefjord – 2011–12
Håkan Malmström – Ham-Kam – 2008
Robin Malmqvist – Tromsø – 2011
 – Viking, Moss 1997–2000
Peter Markstedt – Lyn – 2004
Christer Mattiasson – Lillestrøm – 2001
Stefan Mogren – Haugesund – 2000–01
Guillermo Molins – Sarpsborg 08, Rosenborg – 2020, 2021, 2021–
Albin Mörfelt – Vålerenga – 2021
Mattias Moström – Molde – 2008–20
David Myrestam – Haugesund – 2012–17
Alexander Nadj – Lillestrøm – 2011
Daniel Nannskog – Stabæk – 2006–10
Aleksander Damnjanovic Nilsson – Sandefjord – 2022– 
Marcus Nilsson – Stabæk – 2016–17
Per Nilsson – Odd Grenland – 2005–07
Rikard Nilsson – Lyn – 2009
Roger Nordstrand – Brann – 1995
Viktor Noring – Bodø/Glimt – 2013
Mattias Nylund – Aalesund – 2007
Kjell Olofsson – Moss – 2000–02
Peter Olofsson – Bryne – 2000–02
Jakob Orlov – Brann – 2014, 2016–17
Daniel Örlund – Fredrikstad, Rosenborg – 2008, 2010–14
Jakob Olsson – Sandnes Ulf – 2013
Andreas Ottosson – Tromsø, Start – 1999–2001
Stefan Paldan – Brann – 1997–2000
Hans Palmquist – Moss – 1997–2001
Johan Paulsson – Bryne – 2002–03
Dejan Pavlovic – Bryne – 2001–03
John Pelu – Rosenborg, Haugesund – 2008–09, 2009–10
Joakim Persson – Stabæk – 2006
Tom Pettersson – Lillestrøm – 2021–
Magnus Powell – Lillestrøm, Lyn – 2000–07
Rade Prica – Rosenborg – 2009–11
Anders Prytz – Fredrikstad – 2007
Joel Riddez – Strømsgodset – 2008–10
Markus Ringberg – Fredrikstad, Ham-Kam – 2004–06, 2008
Fredrik Risp – Stabæk – 2009
Björn Runström – Molde – 2010
Marcus Sahlman – Tromsø – 2009–11
Anton Salétros – Sarpsborg 08 – 2020–
Magnus Samuelsson – Haugesund – 2000
Svante Samuelsson – Brann – 1998–2001
Marcus Sandberg – Vålerenga, Stabæk – 2016–17, 2018–21 
Niklas Sandberg – Stabæk  – 2008–09
Pontus Segerström – Stabæk – 2007–09
Maic Sema – Haugesund – 2012–14
Dennis Schiller – Lillestrøm, Molde – 1987–99
Rami Shaaban – Fredrikstad – 2006–07
Pontus Silfwer – Mjøndalen – 2019
Moonga Simba – Brann – 2021
Johan Sjöberg – Fredrikstad – 2007
Joakim Sjöhage – Brann – 2007
Pascal Simpson – Vålerenga – 1998–2000
Christian Rubio Sivodedov – Strømsgodset – 2017–18
Tom Söderberg – Sogndal – 2014
Ole Söderberg – Molde – 2012–13
Håkan Söderstjerna – Fredrikstad – 2004
Isak Ssewankambo – Molde – 2016–18
Fredrik Stoor – Rosenborg, Vålerenga, Lillestrøm – 2007–08, 2011–14
Glenn Ståhl – HamKam – 2001–05
Magnus Svensson – Viking – 1998–99
 – Stabæk – 1998–99
Arash Talebinejad – Tromsø – 2006
Jimmy Tamandi – Lyn – 2008–09
Andreas Tegström – Sandefjord, Fredrikstad – 2006–08
Christopher Telo – Molde – 2017–19
Daniel Theorin – Lyn – 2005–06
Pavle Vagić – Rosenborg – 2021–
Stefano Vecchia – Rosenborg – 2021–
Leopold Wahlstedt – Odd – 2021–
Olof Hvidén-Watson – Odd,  – 2006–07
Jörgen Wålemark – Lillestrøm – 1997
Victor Wernersson – Stabæk – 2021
Jesper Westerberg – Lillestrøm – 2012
Rasmus Wiedesheim-Paul – Rosenborg – 2021
Christian Wilhelmsson – Stabæk – 2000–03
Jonas Wirmola – Skeid – 1997
Samuel Wowoah – Stabæk – 2004

Syria
George Mourad – Tromsø – 2010

Tanzania
Henry Shindika – Kongsvinger – 2010

Togo
Komlan Amewou – Strømsgodset – 2008–10
Lalawélé Atakora – Fredrikstad – 2009–11

Trinidad and Tobago
Sheldon Bateau – Sarpsborg – 2019

Tunisia
Souhaieb El Amari – Molde – 2008–09
Karim Essediri – Tromsø, Bodø/Glimt, Rosenborg, Lillestrøm – 2001–11
Issam Jebali – Rosenborg – 2018
Amor Layouni – Bodø/Glimt, Vålerenga – 2017–19, 2021–
Khaled Mouelhi – Lillestrøm – 2005–10
Sofien Moussa – Tromsø – 2016–17
Sebastian Tounekti – Bodø/Glimt – 2020–

Turkey
Hasan Kuruçay – Ham-Kam – 2022–

Uganda
Tony Mawejje – Haugesund – 2014

Ukraine
Ruslan Babenko – Bodø/Glimt – 2016
Oleksiy Khoblenko – Stabæk – 2021
Serhiy Pohorilyi – Bodø/Glimt – 2016
Yuriy Yakovenko – Ham-Kam – 2022–

United States
Chad Barrett – Vålerenga – 2012
Wade Barrett – Fredrikstad – 2004
Joseph Bendik – Sogndal – 2011
Rhett Bernstein – Mjøndalen – 2015
Nat Borchers – Odd Grenland – 2006–07
Jeb Brovsky – Strømsgodset – 2014
Adin Brown – Aalesund – 2005, 2007–08
Ricardo Clark – Stabæk – 2012
Steve Clark – Hønefoss – 2010
Ramiro Corrales – Ham-Kam, Brann – 2005–07
Sean Cunningham – Stabæk – 2012
Danny Cruz – Bodø/Glimt – 2015
Alex DeJohn – Start – 2015–16
Mix Diskerud – Stabæk, Rosenborg – 2009–11, 2012–14
Hunter Freeman – Start – 2009–10
Romain Gall – Stabæk – 2020
Joshua Gatt – Molde – 2011–13, 2015–16
Clarence Goodson – Start – 2009–10
Orest Grechka – Moss – 2001
Cole Grossman – Stabæk – 2015–16
Ethan Horvath – Molde – 2015–16
Alex Horwath – Brann – 2016–17
Erik Hurtado – Mjøndalen – 2015
Andrew Jacobson – Stabæk – 2014
Lagos Kunga – Kristiansund – 2021
Tyrel Lacey – Lyn – 2009
Pat Noonan – Aalesund – 2008
Troy Perkins – Vålerenga – 2008–09
Rubio Rubin – Stabæk – 2017
Robbie Russell – Sogndal, Rosenborg – 2002–04, 2004–05
Adam Skumawitz – Aalesund – 2003
A. J. Soares – Viking – 2015–16
Ben Spencer – Molde – 2013
Michael Stephens – Stabæk – 2014
Paul Torres – Sandnes – 2015
Zarek Valentin – Bodø/Glimt – 2014–15
Brian Waltrip – Sandefjord, Molde – 2006, 2008
Brian West – Fredrikstad – 2004–09
Quentin Westberg – Sarpsborg 08 – 2015
Henry Wingo – Molde – 2019–20

Uruguay
Maximiliano Bajter – Brann – 2011
Felipe Carvalho – Vålerenga – 2018–21
Sebastián Eguren – Rosenborg – 2005
Carlos Grossmüller – Sandefjord – 2017
Diego Guastavino – Lyn, Brann – 2008–11
Alejandro Lago – Rosenborg – 2005, 2007–11
Nicolás Mezquida – Brann, Lillestrøm – 2011
Facundo Rodríguez – Sandefjord – 2017

Venezuela
Fernando de Ornelas – Odd Grenland – 2005–08
Juan Fuenmayor – Vålerenga – 2009
Ronald Hernández – Stabæk – 2017–19
Ruberth Morán – Odd Grenland – 2006

Wales
Chris Dawson – Viking – 2016–17
Ryan Nicholls – Strømsgodset – 1994
Josh Pritchard – Tromsø – 2013
Rhys Weston – Viking – 2006

Zimbabwe
Matthew Rusike – Stabæk – 2019

Notes

References

 
Norwegian Eliteserien
foreign players
Association football player non-biographical articles